Iresia psyche is a species of tiger beetle in the genus Iresia.

It is found in Peru and Venezuela.

References

Cicindelidae
Beetles described in 1994